Llantwit Major School is a school in the town of Llantwit Major in the Vale of Glamorgan, on the coast of south Wales. The school consists of a separate primary and secondary school which are located on the same site.
 
A large section of the comprehensive was burned to the ground in 1991 and rebuilt a year later. A further rebuild was scheduled to begin 2011/2012 but was scrapped due to lack of funding. A new building broke ground in September 2015 and was completed at the end of February 2017. Demolition of the old blocks has since been completed. It shares its site with primary school Ysgol Y Drige.

The school's departmental success in both sport and drama is renowned over much of the Vale, having won awards and acclaim for both.

The current headteacher is Fiona Greville. She succeeded Dr Vince Browne who had been in charge since 2004, with the exception of the 2010–11 school year where Deborah Thomas became acting head.

The school was temporarily closed due to the COVID-19 pandemic in the United Kingdom on 20 March 2020, re-opening on 4 September 2020.

External links
 School Website

Secondary schools in the Vale of Glamorgan
Llantwit Major